Nightmares is a 1983 American horror anthology film directed by Joseph Sargent and starring Emilio Estevez, Lance Henriksen, Cristina Raines, Veronica Cartwright, and Richard Masur. The film is made up of four short films based on urban legends; the first concerns a woman who encounters a killer in the backseat of her car; the second concerns a video game-addicted teenager who is consumed by his game; the third focuses on a fallen priest who is stalked by a pickup truck from hell; and the last follows a suburban family battling a giant rat in their home.

Nightmares was originally filmed as a two-hour pilot of a proposed television series to be broadcast by the NBC network during the 1983–1984 TV season.

Plot

Terror in Topanga
During a routine traffic stop one night, a highway patrolman is viciously stabbed multiple times by an unseen assailant; the perpetrator is identified by various TV and radio reporters as William Henry Glazier, a murderous escapee of a mental institution who is currently terrorizing the Topanga area.

Meanwhile, Lisa, a housewife and heavy smoker, puts her children to bed as a news bulletin warning about Glazier appears on her television. Lisa discovers that she is out of cigarettes, prompting her to rush to the store to buy some more. Her husband Phillip forbids her from leaving the house at such a late hour with a killer on the loose, and advises her to kick her habit instead. Despite this, she writes Phillip a note, then sneaks to her car and drives to the store.

During the drive, Lisa listens to a radio bulletin warning residents about Glazier, before she is startled by a hitchhiker. Lisa reaches the store and buys groceries and cigarettes. During the drive home, Lisa discovers that she is almost out of gas, and with all the local gas stations already closed for the night, she stops at an out-of-the-way station. The attendant who approaches her happens to perfectly match Glazier's physical appearance. Lisa also grows increasingly alarmed as the attendant seems to be studying her car and herself intently. Suddenly, the attendant lunges at the car with the gas nozzle, breaking the window. He drags Lisa out of the car, then draws a pistol and shoots the actual Glazier, who was revealed to be hiding in Lisa's back seat the entire time. The attendant calms Lisa and offers to call the police.

Later, the police drive the frightened Lisa back home. Phillip asks if Lisa got her cigarettes, and Lisa responds by showing the pack and throwing it away in a trash can.

The Bishop of Battle
J.J. Cooney is an immensely talented video game player and arcade game hustler, alongside his friend Zock Maxwell. The two of them head into an inner-city arcade to challenge a gang of Hispanic players to a few rounds of Pleiades, offering the winner a dollar per game with a five game minimum. After a few games, one of the gang members recognizes J.J., and tells the others that they are getting hustled, prompting J.J. and Zock to escape.

J.J. and Zock head to the arcade at the local shopping mall, with J.J. hoping to use the money he got from hustling to try and beat The Bishop of Battle: a notoriously difficult video game that centers on players trying to fight off enemies and escape from a 3-D maze that features thirteen different levels. Zock mentions how no one they know has ever made it to the thirteenth level, to the point that he and many others believe it is just a myth. J.J., however, is convinced that the thirteenth level is real, as he heard about a player in New Jersey who reached it twice. After an argument about J.J.'s obsession with video games, particularly The Bishop of Battle, J.J. gives Zock his cut of the profits as Zock leaves for home. J.J. repeatedly tries and fails to make it to the thirteenth level, but only manages to make it to level 12. Determined not to give up, even after closing time, J.J. tries to play one more game, only for the owner of the arcade to force him to leave.

At J.J.'s house, his parents also voice their concern with his obsession with gaming, primarily about how it is affecting his performance in school, leading them to ground him until his grades improve. That night, J.J. sneaks out when his parents are asleep and breaks into the arcade to attempt to finish the game. J.J.'s parents are awoken by a call from Zock, who is worried if J.J. made it home or not, leading them to discover J.J. is gone. Back at the arcade, J.J finally manages to reach the thirteenth level. Suddenly, the arcade cabinet's screen begins flickering various colors and shapes, and the cabinet itself begins shaking violently until it collapses. The Bishop of Battle's voice rings out, commending J.J., and welcomes him to level 13, before the cabinet releases a wave of energy. After the wave passes, the game's 3-D enemies fly out of the cabinet into the real world. The enemies fire lasers at J.J. that manage to do serious damage to the surrounding arcade machines, but J.J. manages to defend himself with the gun from the game's controls. He flees to the parking lot, but drops his gun in the process. The Bishop of Battle eventually appears, drawing closer and closer to a terrified J.J.

The next morning, Zock and J.J.'s parents head to the arcade in search of J.J. They discover the damage the arcade sustained during the previous night, as well as the Bishop of Battle cabinet, having been mysteriously reconstructed. Zock hears J.J.'s voice emanating from the cabinet, reciting the Bishop of Battle's lines from the game. Zock and J.J.'s parents then discover J.J. on the screen, watching as he turns into the sprite of the game's player character.

The Benediction
Frank MacLeod, a Catholic priest, is tending a field near the small parish where he serves. A doe tentatively approaches him, but it is quickly bitten and killed by a vicious rattlesnake. MacLeod attempts to kill the snake, then manages to throw it away, watching as it disappears into thin air, before discovering that it managed to bite him on the hand. He wakes up in bed, screaming, revealing that the experience was a nightmare.

Later that day, Frank directs the funeral of a young boy, but is unable to provide the mourners with comfort. Visiting his bishop, Frank explains how he witnessed the boy's death first-hand and how the experience has given him a crisis of faith. Ignoring the advice of his fellow priest, Frank resigns and leaves the rectory with some holy water. He leaves in his car, in search of a new purpose in life.

He encounters a black Chevrolet C-20 Fleetside with tinted windows on the road shortly after he leaves, and signals for it to pass, but it goes at the same time he does, nearly causing an accident. A while later, Frank has a flashback to the death of the young boy mentioned earlier: the child had been critically injured during a robbery of the local grocery store, and while the parents wanted him to administer last rites, Frank wanted to call an ambulance in an attempt to revive the child. Afterwards, the same truck from earlier appears out of nowhere behind Frank and rams into his car, detaching his rear bumper and forcing him off the road. Frank then has a flashback to his talk with the Bishop, where he mentions that he has been plagued with visions of anarchy, his lost faith convincing him that there is no God who would allow such suffering.

As Frank attempts to fix the bumper, the truck appears again, nearly running him over. Frank attempts to escape, but the truck manages to catch up with him as he desperately asks its unseen driver what they want, before once again being forced off the road. Frank gets back on the road again, keeping a close lookout for the truck. He soon hears an ominous rumbling sound, and discovers a large bulge appearing in the ground. The truck explodes out of the ground and once again turns to Frank, prompting him to drive away. It is then revealed that the truck is Satanic in origin. The demonic truck destroys Frank's car in a collision that does no damage to the truck, further proving its supernatural properties. Injured from the crash and left with nowhere to run, Frank climbs out of his ruined car as the Satanic truck closes in for the kill. In desperation, Frank tosses the container of holy water he had been carrying at the truck, vaporizing it, before he falls unconscious. Emergency responders arrive at the scene, but do not find evidence that the truck was ever there. Frank has one final flashback of a talk with his bishop, who mentions that only a very few individuals have been given signs that higher powers exist. He requests that the paramedics take him to the hospital located in his parish, having regained his faith.

Night of the Rat
One stormy night, housewife Claire Houston hears something scurrying in the attic and walls of her house. While she believes it to be rats, her husband, Steven, believes it to just be the wind, advising her to go to sleep. The next morning, Steven discovers that Claire has been browsing the phone book to look for an exterminator, as she believes that there is a rat infestation. Steven does not want to spend any extra money, and simply suggests that Claire set up a few mousetraps. After Steven leaves for work, Claire hears noises coming from the cabinets in her kitchen. When she goes to investigate, she watches as drinking glasses shatter and cans of food are knocked off the shelves.

Later that night, Steven sets up mousetraps in the attic. A rat is soon caught in one of the traps, and Steven throws the dead rat in the garbage. Meanwhile the family cat, Rosie, investigates the house's crawlspace, where she is mauled to death by an unseen creature. The next day, Claire's daughter, Brooke, discovers that Rosie is missing and becomes worried. At the same time, the kitchen sink is revealed to be clogged with rat hair. Claire sets out to find Rosie, entering the crawlspace to look for her. She finds Rosie's corpse, but also begins hearing ominous noises and sees the silhouette of a large creature with glowing red eyes peering out at her in the darkness. Later that day, Brooke discovers that her room and her toys have been torn to shreds. Entering the room, Claire discovers that the only toy left untouched is a stuffed rat doll, just as the lights begin flickering on and off.

Eventually, Claire calls an exterminator, Mel Keefer, who discovers that the creature, which he has identified as a rat, has managed to gnaw through the pipes and the power cables inside, causing the flickering lights. Keefer also discovers a large, saliva-covered hole behind a cabinet in the kitchen, just as Steven comes home. Steven is unhappy that Claire has hired Keefer, and asks him to leave.

That night, Brooke sleeps in the guest room as she hopes for Rosie to come back. Claire then receives a phone call from Mel, who has made a breakthrough: he has looked in an old book he owns for information about a creature known as "The Devil Rodent". According to legend, the Devil Rodent is a large, malevolent rat with large amounts of strength and cunning that used to terrorize individuals in 17th century Europe. Mel also mentions that the Devil Rodent cannot be destroyed, just as Steven grabs the phone and tells Keefer not to call again. Suddenly, the family hear the piano downstairs playing jumbled notes. They discover that the keys have been gnawed on as Brooke comes downstairs. Steven manages to save her after a china cabinet nearly falls on her. Discovering more saliva-covered holes in the wall, and hearing the radio suddenly turn on and off, Steven loads a shotgun and goes in search of the creature as Claire and Brooke hide upstairs. The power turns on and off repeatedly as Steven searches the kitchen. Brooke hears the creature in the ceiling, prompting Steven to go up to the attic.

The door to the guest room suddenly slams shut as Brooke begins screaming. Kicking the door open, Steven and Claire come face to face with the Devil Rodent itself. The giant rat proceeds to demonstrate psychokinetic abilities, moving furniture, opening and closing doors and windows, and damaging the room repeatedly with a loud roar. The Devil Rodent manages to mentally communicate with Brooke, who tells her parents that the creature is a mother, and is looking for her baby. Steven rushes into the kitchen, roots through the garbage can, and pulls out the dead rat he originally threw away. He places it in a shoebox and puts the box near the window. The Devil Rodent moves towards the box and reclaims her baby. Ultimately, Steven is unable to shoot the Devil Rodent, who unleashes one last roar, and disappears out the window. The frightened family reunite, shedding tears of relief.

Cast
Terror in Topanga
 Cristina Raines as Lisa
 Anthony James as The Store Clerk
 William Sanderson as The Gas Station Attendant
 Lee Ving as William Henry Glazier
 Clare Torao as Mori, The Newswoman (credited as Clare Nono)

The Bishop of Battle
 Emilio Estevez as J.J. Cooney
 Louis Giambalvo as Jerry Cooney
 Mariclare Costello as Adele Cooney
 Moon Unit Zappa as Pamela
 Billy Jayne as Zock Maxwell
 James Tolkan as Voice of the Bishop of Battle

The Benediction
 Lance Henriksen as MacLeod
 Tony Plana as Father Luis Del Amo
 Timothy Scott as Sheriff 
 Robin Gammell as Bishop
 Rose Mary Campos as Mother

Night of the Rat
 Richard Masur as Steven Houston
 Veronica Cartwright as Clair Houston
 Bridgette Andersen as Brooke Houston
 Albert Hague as Mel Keefer

Production
It has been a long-held belief that the four segments of the film were initially conceived and shot for ABC's thriller anthology series Darkroom, but were deemed too intense for television. However, on the audio commentary on the 2015 Blu-ray release, executive producer Andrew Mirisch clarifies that the film actually began life as a pilot for an unnamed anthology series for NBC before becoming a theatrical feature for Universal Pictures.

Reception

Though the poster and trailer boasted that the film would be a "sleeper" and "one you won't forget", the film was not well received on release. On Rotten Tomatoes it has an approval rating of 29% based on seven reviews, with an average rating of 5.5/10.

In her review for the New York Times, Janet Maslin wrote, "Nothing spoils a horror story faster than a stupid victim. And Nightmares, an anthology of four supposedly scary episodes, has plenty of those."

Time Out praised The Bishop of Battle, but stated, "In general, though, the scripting is unimaginative, derivative, and desperately predictable as the film limps through its jokily cautionary tales."

Home media
The film was released on VHS by Universal Pictures in the 1980s, and on Betamax in 1983. It was later released on VHS and DVD by Anchor Bay Entertainment in 1999 in "Full Frame (1.33:1) Presentation" and has since gone out of print.

On December 22, 2015, Scream Factory released Nightmares on Blu-ray.

See also
 Body Bags, a 1993 horror anthology that also was produced for television, and also had major filmmakers attached (John Carpenter and Tobe Hooper)
 Creepshow, a series of anthology horror films helmed by Stephen King and George A. Romero

References

External links
 Project to make actual The Bishop of Battle video game
 
 
 
 Nightmares at Box Office Mojo

1983 films
1983 horror films
American horror anthology films
Films about computing
Films about video games
Films based on urban legends
Films directed by Joseph Sargent
Films scored by Craig Safan
Films with screenplays by Christopher Crowe (screenwriter)
1980s monster movies
American monster movies
Universal Pictures films
1980s English-language films
1980s American films